State Hill is an unincorporated community in Lower Heidelberg Township, Pennsylvania in Berks County, Pennsylvania. The area that is now State Hill was once called Lorah. This was named for the first settler within the village's boundary. At one time, the main road through the unincorporated community was called Dry Road. It received the name for lack of water to tap into for wells. This road is now known as Brownsville Road. 

The village started out as just a few cabins, but by the mid-1800s had built a tavern. It was called Dry Tavern, named after the road it was on. The village has a great view of Blue Marsh Lake along Brownsville Rd. It is also home to an extinct elementary school, Lower Heidelberg Consolidated School, which ran from 1931 to 2006. It is served by the academically prestigious Wilson School District. State Hill also has several businesses, including Berks Western Telecom, Ganly's Pub and Deli, Blue Marsh Taxidermy, a Western Berks Fire Department station, and the Lower Heidelberg Township Police and Municipal building. Ganly's was built in 1993. It was built where The Beer Garden Tavern used to be located. 

Unincorporated communities in Berks County, Pennsylvania
Unincorporated communities in Pennsylvania